The Baldwin Building is a site on the National Register of Historic Places located in Fromberg, Montana. It was added to the Register on January 28, 1993.

The original owner, C.J. Baldwin, had both a buggy implement dealership and lumber company under two false fronts. In 1919 he began using the building for a Ford dealership. In 1936 the building was purchased by two mechanics and became a gas station and garage. At this time a new store front was constructed and both the buildings joined under a single false-front.

References

Commercial buildings completed in 1911
National Register of Historic Places in Carbon County, Montana
1911 establishments in Montana
Commercial buildings on the National Register of Historic Places in Montana
Auto dealerships on the National Register of Historic Places
Gas stations on the National Register of Historic Places in Montana